Zhai Xiaochuan (born March 24, 1993) is a Chinese professional basketball player. He currently plays for the Beijing Ducks of the Chinese Basketball Association.

He represented China's national basketball team at the 2015 FIBA Asia Championship in Changsha, China. There, he recorded his team's best two point field goal percentage.

References

External links
Asia-basket.com Profile
NBADraft.net Profile
Zhai chases down William to deny his lay-up attempt - 2015 FIBA Asia Championship - Youtube.com video

1993 births
Living people
Basketball players at the 2016 Summer Olympics
Basketball players from Hebei
Beijing Ducks players
Chinese men's basketball players
Olympic basketball players of China
Sportspeople from Tangshan
Power forwards (basketball)
Small forwards
Basketball players at the 2014 Asian Games
Asian Games competitors for China
2019 FIBA Basketball World Cup players